In 2007 Nepal repealed the laws against gay sex and introduced several laws which explicitly protected sexual orientation. The Nepalese Constitution now recognizes LGBT rights as fundamental rights. Based on a ruling of the Supreme Court of Nepal in late 2007, the government was also considering the legalization of same-sex marriage. According to several sources, the Constitution of 2015 was expected to include it. Although the Constitution explicitly says that "marginalized" communities are to be granted equal rights under the law, and that Nepal's LGBT people fall into this category, it does not explicitly address the legalization of same-sex marriage.

The Nepalese Constitution, approved by the Constituent Assembly on 16 September 2015, includes several provisions pertaining to the rights of LGBT people. These are the right to acquire a citizenship certificate in accordance to one's gender identity, a prohibition on discrimination on any ground including sex by the State and by private parties, eligibility for special protections that may be provided by law, and the right of access to public services for gender and sexual minorities.

Nepal is often considered a role model for LGBT rights in South Asia, due to its more tolerant laws, but it has been slower than India at adopting laws supporting transgender individuals. Despite these supportive laws and provisions, LGBT people still face societal discrimination in Nepal and there is significant pressure to conform and to marry a partner of the opposite sex.

Terminology
The term LGBTI is increasingly used in Nepal, rather than just LGBT, with the I denoting intersex people. The term "gender and sexual minorities" is used in the Constitution of Nepal. Among young Nepalis, the terms "queer" (Q) and "MOGAI" (Marginalized Orientations, Gender Identities, and Intersex) are also used. Certain activists have also coined an acronym PoMSOGIESC, standing for "people of marginalized sexual orientation, gender identity & sex characteristics", to encompass a larger spectrum of identities beyond the LGBT terminology.

Legality of same-sex sexual activity
Before the transition from the Kingdom of Nepal to the Federal Democratic Republic of Nepal in 2007, private homosexual relations between consenting adults was a crime. Among others, cross-dressing was also illegal under various laws against public immorality. Such provisions were abolished after the end of the monarchy.

The age of consent in Nepal is 18, regardless of gender and sexual orientation.

Recognition of same-sex relationships

Nepali family law does not recognize same-sex marriages, same-sex civil unions, or provide equal rights to same-sex live-in couples, or any other form of recognition for same-sex couples.

Sunil Babu Pant and Others v. Nepal Government

One of the first cases to determine the shift in legislation regarding LGBTI rights in Nepal was the 2007 Supreme Court case Sunil Babu Pant and Others v. Nepal Government. After their participation in demonstrations that brought down the monarchy, LGBT rights groups, found themselves largely ignored by the current political establishment, and turned to the judiciary as a more effective way to secure their rights. In April 2007, a coalition of organizations representing LGBTI Nepalis filed a writ petition under Article 107 (2) of the Interim Constitution of Nepal.

The petition, filed by the Blue Diamond Society, Mitini Nepal, Cruse AIDS Nepal and Parichaya Nepal, expressed "dissenting view with the prevalent societal structures or norms as well as legal provisions adopted by the state based on the interest of majority people". The petition asked that Nepal officially recognize "transgender individuals as a third gender, prohibit any discriminatory laws on the basis of sexual orientation and gender identity, and invest due finances for reparations by the State to victims of State violence and discrimination".

On 21 December 2007, the Supreme Court ruled that the new democratic government must create laws to protect LGBTI rights and change existing laws that are tantamount to discrimination. Based on the Yogyakarta Principles and the Special Procedures of the UN Human Rights Council, the court concluded that sexual orientation is to be defined by one's self-identification and a natural process rather than a result of "mental, emotional or psychological disorder". While not explicitly legalizing same-sex marriage, the ruling instructed the government to form a committee to look into "decriminalizing and de-stigmatizing same-sex marriage".

Response to the ruling
A bill to legalize same-sex marriage was drafted and was supposed to be introduced by 2010. In the drafting of the new Nepalese Constitution, same-sex marriage and protection for sexual minorities were supposed to be established. However, negotiations on the new Constitution failed and Prime Minister Baburam Bhattarai dissolved the Constituent Assembly on 28 May 2012 in preparation for new elections. As a result, the future of explicitly addressing the legality of same-sex marriage was uncertain. Ultimately, the Constitution was adopted in 2015 but does not address same-sex marriage.

As of 2019, a bill to legalise same-sex marriage was being drafted and prepared by the government, though LGBT activists have accused it of being "lukewarm" in its support. In August 2018, former Prime Minister Baburam Bhattarai urged to legalise same-sex marriage.

The new Nepali Civil Code, which came into effect in August 2018, does not address same-sex marriage and specifically defines marriage as being between partners of the opposite sex. Activists have called out the Civil Code as unconstitutional and contrary to Supreme Court guidelines.

Gender recognition
On 31 October 2021 twenty nine LGBT and intersex rights organizations, two federations, five loose networks and others have collectively proposed an Act regarding Gender Identity, 2021. Queer Youth Group, an LGBT rights organization, has filed several writ petitions at the Supreme Court of Nepal demanding legal recognition of gender identity. On 2022 March 29, the group proposed A Directive on Gender Recognition for Intersex People, A Directive on Gender Recognition for transgender men and transgender women and A Directive on Gender Recognition for Non-Binary and Third Gender People, proposed to be promulgated by the Supreme Court.

Third gender recognition
The Supreme Court has dictated that the category "other" or anya, representing non-cisgender identities be added to all official documents and Nepalis identifying as such be given citizenship documents to reflect their new status. The government has started issuing citizenship with an "other" ("O") option to transgender people on a rolling basis. This allows for "third gender" identifying individuals to open bank accounts, own property and register for universities. In 2008, Bishnu Adhikari became the first Nepali citizen to officially register under the "third gender" category, with Badri Pun being the second. Other legal accomplishments include allowing citizens to register to vote as "third gender". In 2015, Monica Shahi became the first person to gain a passport with the "other" gender category, and Bhumika Shrestha became the first transgender woman to travel aboard with a passport that identified her as an "other" gender. 

Nepal, similarly to India, Bangladesh and Pakistan, has an indigenous third gender community, considered by society as neither male or female. Such individuals, known as metis, are assigned male at birth but commonly act, dress and behave as female. Although metis (मेटी) have traditionally had important roles at weddings or at the birth of a child to ward off evil spirits, they now regularly face discrimination in education, health, housing, and employment. They are often referred to as transgender in English language publications. The term fulumulu (फुलुमुलु) is used in eastern Nepal. However, a publication of 2021 has challenged the existence of the term, and said it rather is pholo-molo. Among the Gurung people, there is a tradition of men dancing in female clothing, called maarunis, typically at barracks or at royal palaces, and are believed to bring good luck.

In 2007, the Supreme Court legally established a gender category called "other". The Nepali Supreme Court stated that the criteria for identifying one's gender is based on the individual's self-identification.

The Supreme Court's decision to implement a "third gender" may have stemmed from the long-held contemporary acknowledgment of gender variant peoples, known as metis as well as the religious traditions revering non-gender conforming characters. In a global perspective, Nepal's Supreme Court decision also contrasts with neighboring India's developments in reviving a colonial-era anti-sodomy law criminalizing same-sex intercourse. However, in other Asian countries/territories such as Hong Kong, Malaysia and Pakistan, there have been trends of progressive judicial decisions on the rights of LGBT people.

In 2019, there were discussions in Parliament to require applicants to undergo sex changes in order to apply for an "O" sex descriptor.

Binary transgender recognition

Nepalese law only allows gender markers to be changed from "M" (male) or "F" (female) to "O". There are no provisions allowing transgender women to have an "F" marker or transgender men having an "M" marker. Certain activists and young LGBTI Nepalis have criticized what they call a "gender trinary", instead advocating for complete self-determination. In 2019, LGBT activist Rukshana Kapali took an open stand against labeling herself as "third gender". She has taken legal steps to amend her gender identity to "female". As of 2021, a writ petition was filed at the Supreme Court of Nepal demanding amendment of her gender as female. Similarly, Nepali media was called out for forcefully using the term 'third gender' to describe trans men and trans women.

On 31 March 2020, the International Transgender Day of Visibility Queer Youth Group and Trans Rights Collective published National Transgender Demand Sheet demanding trans men be able to tick Male gender marker and trans women be able to select the ‘female’ gender marker, including several other concerns of language and privacy.

On 2022 February 21, the Supreme Court of Nepal issued an order to Election Commission in the writ petition of Rukshana Kapali V. Election Commission et al. stating that a transgender woman's gender identity is woman, not third gender. This is the first instance of transgender people being legally recognized in the binary spectrum. Consequently, on 2022 February 27 and March 15, the Supreme Court ordered to issue COVID-19 vaccination certificate and passport to her with a female gender marker.

Non-binary recognition
Nepali activists identify two distinct groups, i.e. third gender and non-binary, beyond the man and woman genders. This is due to the recent development of critiques on third gender, to be a discriminatory word. In 2020, the National Charter of Demands on Legal Recognition of Gender Identity laid forth the option 'non-binary' should be available distinct from 'third gender'. The proposed Gender Identity Act, 2021 also suggests for non-binary and third gender as two different options. A case filed at National Human Rights Commission on 22 November 2020 complaint number 654 also demands for a non-binary option to be added.

Intersex rights

The rights situation of intersex people in Nepal is unclear. Local activists have identified human rights violations, including significant gaps in protection of rights to physical integrity and bodily autonomy, and protection from discrimination.

Census

It was reported that Central Bureau of Statistics officially recognized a "third gender" option, in addition to male and female, in the census of 2011. It was recognized as the world's first national census to list a category other than male or female, it allowed for the government to gain data on the number of "third gender" identifying Nepalis. The census enumeration of third gender experienced many barriers and challenges. Some reported that census enumerators demanded a child to be stripped on their parents lisiting them as 'third gender'. However, no data of third gender were published by the bureau.

Media reported that 2021 census of Nepal shall include LGBTI people. The LGBT and Intersex community of Nepal raised concerns over enumeration of LGBTI as a third gender. Rights group argued that sexual orientation, gender identity and sex characteristics were being clumped into one. Various campaigns were conducted for LGBTI inclusion in census. Civil societies promulgated Charter of Demands on ‘Other gender’ provision in National Census 2078 (2021) condemning what they call 'tokenistic inclusion'.

On 4 July 2021, a writ petition was filed against Central Bureau of Statistics et al. regarding 'tokenistic inclusion' in the census and demanding for a meaningful inclusion, that addresses diversity of Sexual Orientation, Gender Identity and Sex Characteristics. The Supreme Court of Nepal issued a show cause order on 9 July 2021.

Military service
In 2007, two female soldiers were accused of having a relationship and were discharged, but the army claimed that the women were dismissed for "failing to maintain minimum discipline" not based on sexual orientation. The UNDP reports that gays, lesbians and bisexuals can serve openly in the Nepali Army. Nepal military law does not explicitly forbid LGBT people from serving.

Nevertheless, LGBT groups report that discrimination and harassment still occur.

Provisions of the 2015 Constitution
In September 2015, several articles mentioning LGBTI rights in the country's new Constitution were approved by Parliament after lengthy deliberation.
 Article 12 states that people have the right to have citizenship ID that reflects their preferred gender.
 Article 18 covers rights to equality and states that the State will not "discriminate [against] any citizens based on origin, religion, race, caste, tribe, gender, language or ideological conviction or any other status."
 Article 18 also lists LGBTI people among disadvantaged groups that are recognized by the Constitution.

 Article 18 also replaced language from the old Constitution that referenced "male and female" and "son or daughter" with gender-neutral terminology.
 Article 42 lists "gender and sexual minorities" among groups that will have right to participate in state mechanisms and public services based on the "principle of inclusion".

The Constitution went into effect on 20 September 2015.

Living conditions

Society
While the Nepalese political landscape has rapidly changed in the past decade, much of the progressive legislation has not been implemented at the community level. Traditional Nepalese gender roles stem from rigid ideals based on biological sex that ostracize anyone failing to conform. These norms may stigmatize any LGBT Nepalis who choose to operate outside of the gender roles, but affect LGBT women in particular, as women, more than men, are expected to conform to societal expectations.

However, human rights organizations like the Blue Diamond Society, established in 2001, seek to represent LGBT people in Nepal politically and provide assistance with sexual health in the community. A drop-in centre with free HIV testing exists in Kathmandu along with more than 50 different branches of the organization across the country. Other organizations such as Mitini Nepal, Parichaya Samaj and Sahaayam Nepal also exist to provide resources for LGBT Nepalis. The media and public have also become more sympathetic to LGBT rights since homophobic acts and crimes against members of the Blue Diamond Society became public, and after they started their radio program called Pahichan, a program that discusses sexual and gender minority rights.
 
Nepal Pride is an annual LGBT event held in Kathmandu. It was first held in 2001 and was attended by 49 people, most of whom wore masks to avoid being recognized. In recent years, the event has attracted about 1,500 people. It purposefully coincides with the Gai Jatra festival, one of the oldest festivals celebrated in the Kathmandu Valley.

Violence
Gender-based violence against transgender people is a severe issue in Nepal where they often find themselves susceptible to both public and domestic violence, abuse in the workplace and at home, and elsewhere. Reasons for gender-based violence are largely attributed to social taboos and superstitions and deeply entrenched beliefs that propagate derogatory attitudes towards sexual and gender minorities. Violence also stems from law enforcement such as the police force, as many LGBT individuals report severe beatings, body searches and undue detainment. Likewise, results derived from INSEC's monitoring of the situation indicated that subjugating women to domestic violence was considered a deep-rooted traditional practice.

Survey results also show that 20-23% of transgender women in Nepal view domestic violence as being acceptable. Despite efforts of various human rights and LGBT rights NGOs, together with international aid agencies, to lobby for the elimination of violence through the implementation of more effective measures. Complaints by transgender rights activists are directed towards the lackadaisical efforts of the law enforcement agencies in which disputes are settled without any charges pressed against the perpetrators.

Education
The United Nations Development Programme has recommended that Nepal incorporate these ideals into the education system to ensure inclusive and equitable quality education:
 Require all schools and other education providers to adopt anti-bullying policies to protect LGBTI students, and ensure teachers receive training on how to respond to homophobic and transphobic bullying. 
 Integrate education on sexual orientation, gender identity, gender expression, and intersex status into school curricula in age-appropriate ways. 
 Provide non-discriminatory sex education to address taboos surrounding adolescent sexuality, sexual orientation, gender identity, and gender expression and provide adolescents with access to accurate information about the diversity of sexualities, gender identities, and sex variations. 
 Recognize the right of students to freedom of gender expression in the school environment. Students should be allowed to wear uniforms and express an appearance that corresponds to the gender with which they identify.
 Provide all students, including transgender and intersex students, with access to safe toilets and bathroom facilities.
 Develop policies and practices to support transgender students who transition while at school, including by ensuring their rights to privacy, dignity, and respect, and enabling their name and sex or gender details to be amended on school records.
 Provide educational resources for parents of LGBTI children

Nepal's Education Board has implemented information about sexual and gender diversity in the curriculum of grades 7-9 (age 13–15), making Nepal the second Asian country, after Mongolia, to implement this. Universities also possess courses about LGBT issues. However, many LGBT children still face discrimination and are unable to complete their education due to "threats, bullying, and neglect from fellow students and teachers alike." Furthermore, transgender Nepalis face severe gender-based violence and are unable to receive a proper education, especially in rural areas.

Politics
There has been an increased level of participation in the political arena by openly LGBTI politicians such as Sunil Babu Pant, the first openly gay parliamentarian in Asia. Pant served in the Federal Parliament from 2008 to 2012. Pant was also one of the 27 experts at the meeting consolidating the Yogyakarta Principles.

The Communist Party of Nepal-Maoist made several homophobic statements during the Civil War. Until 2007, party members had described homosexuality as "a production of capitalism" that "doesn't exist under socialism", and LGBT people as "social pollutants." However, since 2008, with the end of the insurgency and the beginning of a multi-party democracy, the Maoist Party has supported LGBT rights.

Health
The HIV/AIDS epidemic affects LGBTI Nepalis across the board. 2009 estimates showed that about 3.8% of men who have sex with men (MSM) in Nepal were HIV-positive; an increase from 3.3% in 2007. In 2007, MSM in Nepal were 9.2 times more likely to acquire HIV infection than heterosexuals, notably lower than neighboring China (45 times more likely) or India (17.6 times more likely).

Lesbian couples are also denied access to vitro fertilization (IVF). Across the country, there is a severe lack of access to comprehensive health care as well as a lack of research on the mental, physical, and reproductive needs of LGBT Nepalis.

COVID-19 is thought to have had an impact on the mental health of LGBT; "27.1 per cent said they suffered excessive stress, while 21.6 per cent said they became short-tempered and 13.4 said they suffered from depression".

Hormone replacement therapy and sex reassignment surgery are technically not available in Nepal, though some doctors may perform such procedures. However, they are reported to be "costly". Hormone replacement drugs cost 4,500 rupees for a six-month period. Many Nepali transgender people go to Thailand or India to undergo reassignment surgery.

Tourism

The Nepal Tourism Board has made plans to promote Nepal as an LGBT-friendly tourist destination. An LGBT tourism conference occurred in February 2010. Sensitivity training was conducted in selected catering and hospitality venues.

Popular culture and media representation 
The representation of LGBT community in Nepali mainstream media is minimal. Historically, the portrayal of people of sexual and gender minorities had been in negative connotation or as a comic relief in films and television show. The queer representation have always been caricatures of transgender people, gay people, and lesbians and stereotypical. However, there have been some positive and realistic depictions in recent times.Highway, a 2012 film by Deepak Rauniyar featured a gay character and a transgender character who is a victim of sexual violence.

Soongava: Dance of the Orchids, a 2012 movie was about a lesbian relationship. Actresses Diya Maskey and Nisha Adhikari played the lead roles. The film was also selected as the Nepalese entry for the Best Foreign Language Film at the 86th Academy Awards, but it was not nominated. However, the film has been criticized for its story and cishet male gaze.

Singha Durbar, a 2016 fictional television series by Tsering Rhitar Sherpa about first female prime minister featured a gay character, Bishwa Bishwokarma, press secretary to the PM played by Praween Khatiwada. The television show was broadcast on Nepal Television, the state broadcaster of Nepal. The series was supported by USAID.

Prabal Gurung, a Nepali American fashion designer, is openly gay. Gurung has designed for popular media icons and personalities such as Michelle Obama, Catherine, Duchess of Cambridge, Oprah Winfrey.

Between Queens and the Cities, the first queer memoir from Nepal by Niranjan Kunwar was published on 5 December 2020. The book chronicles the life of the author as a gay man in different cities such as New York and Kathmandu. The book also shows the struggles of a gay man in Nepali society.

In June 2021, an art exhibition with LGBTIQ theme, Queer — A celebration of art and activism was organized in Kaalo.101, an art space based in Patan. The exhibition featured arts primarily from Nepal alongside other countries such as Pakistan, Malaysia, Indonesia and Bangladesh.

Notable LGBT organizations, figures and events in Nepal

Organizations
 Blue Diamond Society
 Mitini Nepal
 Queer Youth Group

Figures
 Anjali Lama, a transgender model
 Suman Pant, whose Supreme Court case established a precedent for same-sex spousal visas
 Sunil Babu Pant, the first openly gay legislator in Nepal
 Bhumika Shrestha, a "third gender" advocate
Bhakti Shah, a Nepali LGBTI activist

Events

Several LGBT-related events are held in Nepal. These include the main Nepal POMSOGIESC (People of Marginalized Sexual Orientation, Gender Identity and Sex Characteristics) Pride Parade, known as Nepal Pride Parade in short, is held on the second Saturday of June since 2019.  Similarly, Queer Womxn Pride is held every year along with mainstream women's rights rally on International Women's Day since 2019, an Queer Indigenous Pride held every year along mainstream indigenous rights rally on International Day of the World's Indigenous Peoples since 2019. Since 2020, a Trans Pride Parade is also observed on the Saturday after 17 December. International events such as International Transgender Day of Visibility, National Coming Out Day, Transgender Day of Remembrance, and International Day Against Homophobia, Transphobia and Biphobia are also observed.

Several smaller events include Asexual Awareness Week (Last week of October), Celebrate Bisexuality Day (23 September), an awareness day for hijras (17 April) and Intersex Awareness Day (26 October).

Summary table

See also

Intersex rights in Nepal
LGBT rights in Asia
Recognition of same-sex unions in Nepal
National LGBTI Day (Nepal)
Human rights in Nepal

References

External links
Globalgayz.com Nepal – Interview with Sunil Pant

 
Law of Nepal